Chairmen of the Chamber of Nations

Below is a list of office-holders:

Sources

Chamber of Nations